David Philipp may refer to:
 David Philipp (biologist), American biologist 
 David Philipp (footballer), German footballer

See also
 David Philip, Scottish footballer 
 David Butt Philip, British operatic tenor